Silvia Parente is an Italian Paralympic gold medallist.

She won a gold medal, and two bronze at the 2006 Winter Paralympics in Turin.

References

External links 
 
 
 
 Torino 2006 Paralympic Winter Games, Alpine Skiing

Paralympic gold medalists for Italy
Paralympic bronze medalists for France
Living people
Medalists at the 2006 Winter Paralympics
Italian female alpine skiers
Year of birth missing (living people)
Paralympic medalists in alpine skiing
Alpine skiers at the 2006 Winter Paralympics
Paralympic alpine skiers of Italy
21st-century Italian women